93.7 Star FM (DXFD 93.7 MHz) is an FM station owned and operated by Bombo Radyo Philippines through its licensee People's Broadcasting Service, Inc. Its studio, offices and transmitter are located at the 5th St. cor. Don E. Sero St., Cotabato City.

References

External links
Star FM Cotabato FB Page
Star FM Cotabato Website

Radio stations in Cotabato City
Radio stations established in 1998